General Balck may refer to:

Hermann Balck (1893–1982), German Wehrmacht general
Viktor Balck (1844–1928), Swedish Army major general
William Balck (1858–1924) Imperial German Army lieutenant general